Norman Kirkwood Ewing (26 December 1870 – 19 July 1928), Australian politician, was a member of three parliaments: the Western Australian Legislative Assembly, the Australian Senate, and the Tasmanian House of Assembly. He became a Judge of the Supreme Court of Tasmania, and was Administrator of Tasmania from November 1923 to June 1924.

Early life
Norman Ewing was born in Wollongong, New South Wales on 26 December 1870. The son of Anglican clergyman Thomas Campbell Ewing and Elizabeth née Thomson, one of his uncles was John Thomson, who himself became a Member of the New South Wales Legislative Assembly. His brothers were John Ewing and Sir Thomas Ewing, who were also members of parliament (though in different jurisdictions).

Ewing was educated at Illawarra College in Wollongong, then Oakwoods at Mittagong, and finally night school in Sydney. Articled to  Fitzhardinge, he became a solicitor in 1894, practising initially at Murwillumbah.

Politics

Later that year, Ewing moved to Perth, Western Australia. He was admitted to the bar the following year, and in 1897 established the firm of Ewing and Downing. That year he published The Practice of the Local Courts of Western Australia.

On 4 May 1897, Ewing was elected to the Western Australian Legislative Assembly seat of Swan as an independent. A few months later he married Maude Louisa Stone, daughter of Sir Edward Stone. They had one son and two daughters. Ewing held the seat of Swan until March 1901, when he resigned it to take up a short-term seat in the first Australian Senate, which he had won on a Free Trade ticket. His term was due to continue until 31 December 1903. In 1902, while still a Senator, Ewing stood unsuccessfully for the position of Mayor of Perth. He resigned as Senator eight months early on 17 April 1903, becoming the first member of either house of the Australian Parliament to resign his seat. In June 1904 he was an independent candidate for the Western Australian Legislative Assembly seat of Canning, but was unsuccessful.

In 1905, Ewing moved to Hobart, Tasmania, where he established the firm of Ewing and Seager. In the federal election of 12 December 1906, he contested a Tasmanian seat in the Senate as an Anti-Socialist, but was defeated by a small margin. He then turned to Tasmanian state politics, winning the Tasmanian House of Assembly seat of Franklin in April 1909. He held the seat for over six years, for the last year of which he was Leader of the Opposition.

Supreme Court of Tasmania
Ewing was made a King's Counsel in 1914, and in September the following year resigned his seat in parliament to accept an appointment as a Judge of the Supreme Court of Tasmania. As Judge of the Supreme Court, he was involved in the 1915 Tasmanian Royal Commission into the public debt sinking fund; charges brought against Victor Ratten in 1918. He was appointed a Deputy Judge of the Supreme Court of the Northern Territory and chair of the 1919–20 Royal Commission into the administration of the Northern Territory, known as the Darwin Rebellion. He also conducted the 1920 Royal Commission in New South Wales into the imprisonment of twelve Industrial Workers of the World members.

From November 1923 to June 1924, Ewing was appointed Administrator of Tasmania, while awaiting the arrival of the new governor Captain Sir James O'Grady. In 1924 he had a stroke, and thereafter worked only intermittently. He died at Launceston on 19 July 1928, and was buried at Carr Villa cemetery.

References

 

 

1870 births
1928 deaths
Judges of the Supreme Court of Tasmania
Judges of the Supreme Court of the Northern Territory
20th-century Australian judges
Australian King's Counsel
Free Trade Party members of the Parliament of Australia
Members of the Australian Senate
Members of the Australian Senate for Western Australia
Members of the Western Australian Legislative Assembly
Members of the Tasmanian House of Assembly
Protectionist Party politicians
Industrial Workers of the World in Australia
People from Wollongong
Leaders of the Opposition in Tasmania
20th-century Australian politicians
Burials in Tasmania